Rober Hatemo (born December 25, 1974) is a Turkish pop singer of Armenian descent.

Life
He is of Armenian descent and was born in Çanakkale.

Discography

Albums 
 Esmer – 1997
 Sen Farklısın – 1998
 Azılı Bela – 2001
 Aşksız Prens – 2003
 Sihirli Değnek – 2006
 Pabucumun Dünyası – 2014

EPs 
 Mahrum – 2010

Singles
 Dikkat – 2015
 Giden Candan Gidiyor – 2017
 Canına Okuyacağım – 2018
 İnsan Sevince – 2022

Charts

References

Living people
1974 births
Turkish pop singers
People from Çanakkale
Ethnic Armenian male singers
Turkish people of Armenian descent
21st-century Turkish singers
21st-century Turkish male singers